The 44th Guillermo Mendoza Memorial Scholarship Foundation Box Office Entertainment Awards (GMMSF-BOEA) is a part of the annual awards in the Philippines held on May 19, 2013. The award-giving body honors Filipino actors, actresses and other performers' commercial success, regardless of artistic merit, in the Philippine entertainment industry.

Winners selection
The winners were chosen from the Top 10 Philippine films of 2012, top-rating shows in Philippine television, top recording awards received by singers, and top gross receipts of concerts and performances.

Award ceremony

On May 19, 2013 at AFP Theatre in Camp Aguinaldo, Quezon City, Philippines, the 44th Box Office Entertainment Awards night was held. The awards night was organized by the Guillermo Mendoza Memorial Scholarship Foundation, Inc. (GMMSFI). The event aired a week later on May 26, as the "Sunday's Best" offering of ABS-CBN.

Awards

Major awards
Phenomenal Box Office Stars – Kris Aquino, Vice Ganda, Ai Ai delas Alas (Sisterakas)
Box Office King – John Lloyd Cruz (The Mistress)
Box Office Queen – Bea Alonzo (The Mistress)
Male Concert Performers of the Year – Jose Manalo and Wally Bayola
Female Concert Performer of the Year – Anne Curtis
Male Recording Artist of the Year – Christian Bautista
Female Recording Artist of the Year – Aiza Seguerra

Film category
Film Actor of the Year – Dingdong Dantes (One More Try)
Film Actress of the Year – Angelica Panganiban, Angel Locsin (One More Try)
Prince of Philippine Movies – Luis Manzano (This Guy's in Love with U Mare!)
Princess of Philippine Movies – Toni Gonzaga (This Guy's in Love with U Mare!)
Most Promising Male Star of the Year – Daniel Padilla
Most Promising Female Star of the Year – Kathryn Bernardo
Most Popular Film Producers – Star Cinema and Viva Films
Most Popular Film Director – Wenn Deramas (Sisterakas)
Most Popular Screenwriter – Olivia Lamasan and Vanessa Valdez (The Mistress)

Music category
Promising Male Singer/Performer – Robin Nievera
Promising Female Singer/Performer – Zia Quizon
Most Popular Recording/Performing Group – Spongecola
Most Promising Recording/Performing Group – Chicsers
Most Popular Novelty Singers – Jose Manalo, Wally Bayola, Ryzza Mae Dizon

Television category
Most Popular Love Team on Television – Richard Yap and Jodi Sta. Maria (ABS-CBN)
All Time Favorite Love Team on Movies and TV – Richard Gomez and Dawn Zulueta (ABS-CBN)
Prince of Philippine Television – Coco Martin (ABS-CBN)
Princess of Philippine Television – Julia Montes (ABS-CBN)
Most Promising Love Team – Daniel Padilla and Kathryn Bernardo (ABS-CBN)
Most Popular Male Child Performer – Bugoy Cariño (ABS-CBN)
Most Popular Female Child Performer – Ryzza Mae Dizon (GMA-7)
Most Popular TV Program News & Public Affairs – 24 Oras (GMA-7)
Most Popular Daytime TV Drama Series – Be Careful With My Heart (ABS-CBN)
Most Popular Primetime TV Drama Series – Walang Hanggan (ABS-CBN)
Most Popular TV Program Musical Variety – Eat Bulaga (GMA-7)
Most Popular TV Program Talent Search/Reality – The X Factor Philippines (ABS-CBN)

Special award
Bert Marcelo Lifetime Achievement Award – Noel Trinidad

Multiple awards

Individuals with multiple awards 
The following individual names received two or more awards:

Companies with multiple awards 
The following companies received two or more awards in the television category:

References

Box Office Entertainment Awards
2013 film awards
2013 television awards
2013 music awards